Damilola Adegbite (born Oluwadamilola Adegbite; 18 May 1985) is Nigerian actress, Model, and Television personality. She played Thelema Duke in the soap opera Tinsel, and Kemi Williams in the movie Flower Girl. She won Best Actress in a TV Series at the 2011 Nigeria Entertainment Awards.

Biography
She was born in Surulere, Lagos State. She attended Queen's College in Yaba, Lagos and studied business administration at Bowen University in Iwo, Osun State. Tinsel was her acting debut. She has also appeared in TV commercials and hosted programs on TV.

Personal life
In August 2014, Adegbite got engaged to Chris Attoh, a fellow actor she met on set of the soap opera Tinsel. In September 2014, the couple welcomed their son Brian. Adegbite and Attoh married privately in Accra, Ghana on 14 February 2015.
In September 2017, news broke that Adegbite's marriage to husband Chris Attoh had crashed. Adegbite had sparked split rumours after she deleted Chris Attoh's surname from her social-media accounts  She also unfollowed him on Instagram, deleted all photos of him from her social media account. Hours later, in an interview, Chris Attoh confirmed his marriage to Damilola Adegbite was over.

Filmography

Films

Television

Theatre 

 The V Monologues

References

External links

Nigerian television actresses
Nigerian film actresses
Actresses from Lagos
1985 births
Living people
Yoruba actresses
Queen's College, Lagos alumni
Bowen University alumni
21st-century Nigerian actresses
Nigerian female models
Yoruba female models
Models from Lagos
Nigerian television personalities
Actresses from Osun State
Nigerian television presenters
Nigerian media personalities